The 1969 County Championship was the 70th officially organised running of the County Championship. Glamorgan won the Championship title in a season which saw games played reduced from 28 to 24.

Table

10 points for a win
5 points to each side for a tie
5 points to side still batting in a match in which scores finish level
Bonus points awarded in first 85 overs of first innings
Batting: 1 point for each 25 runs above 150
Bowling: 2 point for every 2 wickets taken
No bonus points awarded in a match starting with less than 8 hours' play remaining.
Position determined by points gained. If equal, then decided on most wins.
Each team plays 24 matches.

References

1969 in English cricket
County Championship seasons
Welsh cricket in the 20th century